Whitewood is a city in Lawrence County, South Dakota, United States. The population was 879 at the 2020 census.

History
Whitewood was platted in 1888 when the Chicago and North Western Railway was extended to that point. It took its name from nearby Whitewood Creek.

Geography

Whitewood has been assigned the ZIP code 57793 and the FIPS place code 71580.

Demographics

2010 census
At the 2010 census there were 927 people, 374 households, and 232 families living in the city. The racial makup of the city was 91.9% White, 0.8% African American, 3.7% Native American, 0.1% Asian, 0.3% from other races, and 3.2% from two or more races. Hispanic or Latino of any race were 2.5%.

Of the 374 households 33.4% had children under the age of 18 living with them, 46.8% were married couples living together, 8.3% had a female householder with no husband present, 7.0% had a male householder with no wife present, and 38.0% were non-families. 30.7% of households were one person and 12.3% were one person aged 65 or older. The average household size was 2.44 and the average family size was 3.05.

The median age was 38.8 years. 26.9% of residents were under the age of 18; 6.5% were between the ages of 18 and 24; 23.7% were from 25 to 44; 28.8% were from 45 to 64; and 14.1% were 65 or older. The gender makeup of the city was 50.6% male and 49.4% female.

2000 census

At the 2000 census there were 844 people, 330 households, and 224 families living in the city. The population density was 1,303.6 people per square mile (501.3/km). There were 356 housing units at an average density of 549.9 per square mile (211.5/km).  The racial makup of the city was 95.62% White, 2.61% Native American, 0.24% from other races, and 1.54% from two or more races. Hispanic or Latino of any race were 2.13%.

Of the 330 households 35.8% had children under the age of 18 living with them, 53.9% were married couples living together, 10.6% had a female householder with no husband present, and 32.1% were non-families. 26.1% of households were one person and 11.5% were one person aged 65 or older. The average household size was 2.52 and the average family size was 3.00.

The age distribution was 27.4% under the age of 18, 8.6% from 18 to 24, 29.7% from 25 to 44, 19.7% from 45 to 64, and 14.6% 65 or older. The median age was 36 years. For every 100 females, there were 101.4 males. For every 100 females age 18 and over, there were 92.8 males.

The median household income was $29,297 and the median family income  was $30,859. Males had a median income of $25,347 versus $16,597 for females. The per capita income for the city was $12,247. About 15.6% of families and 17.8% of the population were below the poverty line, including 24.5% of those under age 18 and 7.2% of those age 65 or over.

See also
 List of cities in South Dakota

References

External links

 
 Whitewood, South Dakota profile on citydata.com

Cities in Lawrence County, South Dakota
Cities in South Dakota